Multiburner is a device, manufactured by IBM, capable of performing read/write operations with multiple types of recordable media, mainly various CD & DVD formats.

Supported media
Read formats:
 CD-R
 CD-ROM
 CD-RW
 DVD-R
 DVD-RW
 DVD-RAM
 DVD+R
 DVD+RW
 DVD-ROM

Write formats
 CD-R
 CD-RW
 DVD-R
 DVD-RW
 DVD-RAM

In addition to this, a Multi-Burner Plus device supports all recordable DVD formats endorsed by the DVD Forum and DVD+RW Alliance.

See also
 ThinkPad

Computer storage devices